Andrey Vyacheslavovich Lopatov (12 March 1957 – 16 February 2022) was a Russian basketball player who competed for the Soviet Union in the 1980 Summer Olympics and won a bronze medal. 

Lopatov died in February 2022, at the age of 64.

References

External links
 

1957 births
2022 deaths
1982 FIBA World Championship players
1990 FIBA World Championship players
Basketball players at the 1980 Summer Olympics
FIBA World Championship-winning players
Medalists at the 1980 Summer Olympics
Olympic basketball players of the Soviet Union
Olympic bronze medalists for the Soviet Union
Olympic medalists in basketball
People from Inta
Soviet men's basketball players
1978 FIBA World Championship players